Dare is an English rock band from Oldham, England, fronted by former Thin Lizzy keyboard player Darren Wharton. They formed in 1985 and have released ten albums to date, nine studio and one live. An eleventh album was stated as planned to be released in 2019, although this did not happen, the release of Road to Eden announced by the band in January 2022.

History
Dare was formed in 1985 by former Thin Lizzy keyboard player Darren Wharton after Phil Lynott had dissolved the band. By 1987, Dare had gained a local following in Oldham and, in 1987, were signed with a four-year deal by A&M.

The band's debut album, Out of the Silence, was released in 1988 on A&M Records. It was recorded in Los Angeles at singer Joni Mitchell's private studio in Beverly Hills. The lineup for this album consisted of Darren Wharton (vocals/keyboards), Vinny Burns (guitars), Martin 'Shelley' Shelton (bass), James Ross (drums), and Brian Cox (keyboards; later prominent as an astronomer and television presenter).

The follow-up album Blood from Stone was released in 1991, by which time Nigel Clutterbuck played bass guitar and Greg Morgan was on drums. With a much harder edge than the previous release, the second album was produced in Los Angeles by sound engineer Keith Olsen. Wharton since commented that while he is "very proud of that album..., ...we should have stuck to our guns musically and not try and jump on the heavy metal band wagon." He added, "Blood from Stone was written to please the rock press of the world."

Dare had minor success in Europe, but album sales flagged and the band was dropped from their label (which had been acquired by Polygram), despite Blood from Stone peaking at No. 48 in the UK Albums Chart. The band also had five songs in the UK Singles Chart: "Abandon" (No. 71, 1989), "Nothing Is Stronger Than Love" (No. 95, 1989) and "The Raindance" (No. 62, 1989) from Out of the Silence, and "We Don't Need a Reason" (No. 52, 1991) and "Real Love" (No. 67, 1991) from Blood from Stone.

It would be 1998 before a third album was released - Calm Before the Storm, produced by Wharton. Wharton has since commented on the emergence of Dare's Celtic sound, stating, "I think that was mainly a part of my Thin Lizzy roots. Out of the Silence was quite Celtic in some of its stuff. You know, "The Raindance" and "King of Spades". You know, I spent my early career with Thin Lizzy, so that rubbed off me a great deal, working with Phil Lynott and Scott Gorham. And those Irish roots and the Celtic roots, where I live in Wales... You know, it's a very similar type of genre of folk music." By the time Calm Before the Storm was released, in a further personnel reshuffle Vinny Burns, Brian Cox and Nigel Clutterbuck had all departed. Andrew Moore was credited with guitars, Martin Wilding with bass, and Julian Gardner with drums. Under 'additional musicians' Kevin Whitehead was credited with drums and Richard Dews with acoustic guitar and backing vocals. Of those departing, Brian Cox would play with D:Ream before becoming a particle physicist and science communicator. Prior to returning to Dare in 2008, Burns (who departed in 1992 to join Asia) would play with a selection of other bands including Ultravox and Ten, as well as releasing a solo album The Journey in 1999. Clutterbuck eventually returned to Dare in 2014.

Belief was released in 2001. The first single from the album, "White Horses", was playlisted by Sir Terry Wogan on the UK's largest national radio station, BBC Radio 2. Tours throughout Europe and Scandinavia were to follow, including a 12 date tour with Asia in the UK. Line up for the album was Darren Wharton (vocals and keyboards), Richard Dews (acoustic guitar and lead), Andrew Moore (electric guitar and lead), and Julian Gardner (drums and percussion).

In the summer of 2004, Beneath the Shining Water was released. The single "Sea of Roses" received considerable airplay on Radio 2. In 2008 Beneath the Shining Water and Belief were released as a double CD though Warner Music/ADA in the U.S.

In October 2009, Arc of the Dawn was released on Wharton's own label, Legend Records. Line up for the album was Darren Wharton (vocals and keyboards), Richard Dews (guitars and backing vocals), and Kevin Whitehead (drums). Sleeve notes included 'Dare Live' which featured the addition of Vinny Burns on guitars. This set-up was retained for Calm Before the Storm 2 which was released in 2012, a re-record of the original Calm Before the Storm album with previously unreleased bonus tracks.

Dare's sole live album to date, The Power of Nature: Live in Munich was released in 2005. The album was also available in DVD format.

2016 onwards
Dare released Sacred Ground in July 2016. The album is often referred to as studio album seven, given that Calm Before The Storm 2 from 2012 was essentially a re-record, and does include a '7' in the cover artwork design. Line up for Sacred Ground was Darren Wharton (vocals and keyboards), Vinny Burns (guitars), Kevin Whitehead (drums), Nigel Clutterbuck (bass). Sleeve notes featured the addition of Marc Roberts on keyboards for live shows. The album topped the Amazon Rock Charts in the UK, Germany, Spain and Italy, and received predominantly positive reviews, albeit these usually genre-specific. A typical example might be MelodicRock.com which comments that: "the album features some of Wharton’s most mature song writing to date. Thought provoking and passionate, whilst still retaining a dark rock edge". It continues: "the return of the masterful Vinny Burns on guitar is certainly a stroke of brilliance. Vinny's guitar takes the songs to the next level, delivering the rock edge that fans have wanted. Yes, tempo is far more 'up' than recent work and like past Dare albums, it does take several listens to get to know the tunes. The similar pacing makes it a little harder to separate the songs initially, but as always with Dare, it is all about mood. And no one does mood better than Darren Wharton and Vinny Burns". The summation includes: "There are no fillers here – 11 great tracks of keyboard and guitar framed music; this is a wonderful album that takes a step back from the Celtic influences of recent times and a huge step back towards straight ahead moody AOR".

In an interview for metalcovent.com in August 2016, Wharton commented that "I've got a new album almost ready to go for next year, so. So it won't be 4 years 'til the next one".

Tour dates/venues during 2017 included the Oslo Hard Rock Café in Norway, the Rockingham Festival at Nottingham Trent University, UK, Winter Storm in Scotland, and the H.E.A.T festival in Germany. The band continued to tour into 2018 and by September 2018 venues had included Hard Rock Heaven (UK), row Club (Athens, Greece), and Melodic Rock Festival (Sweden). The band had also co-headlined five UK shows with FM. On 4 May 2018, the band announced the Anniversary Special Edition of Out Of The Silence, Out Of The Silence II. The original album has been completely re-recorded and was released on 29 June that year, with pre-sales having started on 18 May. On 9 May 2018, the band announced the launch of a new official website. On 30 November 2018, Dare announced initial European tour details for 2019, which by 6 January 2019 had expanded to 22 dates in Belgium, Germany, Holland, Norway, Spain, Sweden, Switzerland and the UK. A new album was scheduled for release in 2019, but as of July 2020 this had not happened, but was pending according the Dare FaceAche page. Dare continued to tour into 2020 with their first appearance being on the King's call Cruise (4–5 January). Other confirmed dates for 2020 (as of January 2020) were at the Cascais Rock Fest on 25 Jan (with Cutting Crew and The Stranglers), and at the Rock of Ages Festival, Germany 31 July – 2 August. In line with official guidance/regulations, all 2020 show were halted from March 2020 because of the COVID-19 pandemic.

In a Christmas wishes post to fans on Dare's official Facebook page, on 24 December 2020 Wharton commented that the band would "hopefully see you all next year [2021] with our brand new album". 

On 25 August 2021 on Dare's official Facebook page a Christmas headline show at Holmfirth Picturedrome (4 December) was announced. At the same time an update on the pending new album was given: In the coming weeks we'll be announcing the brand new DARE album, title and release date, plus full UK tour dates for 2022. The new album will be released on CD & Vinyl. On 8 October an initial date for 2022 was announced (Chester Live Rooms; 4 March), with additional dates to follow. 

The latest Dare album, Road To Eden was announced by the band on 10 January 2022, with a release date by Legend Records of 1 April 2022. An initial track from the album (the lead track), Born in the Storm was announced at the same time. Line up for the album remains Darren Wharton (vocals and keyboards), Vinny Burns (guitars), Kevin Whitehead (drums), Nigel Clutterbuck (bass) and Marc Roberts (keyboards). Also on the 10 January a 12-date UK headline tour in October 2022 was announced, this kicking off in Leeds on 6 October, and concluding in Newbury on 29 October. Additional dates were later added, these including an appearance at Cambridge Rock Festival.

Dates for 2023 are scheduled to include an appearance at the Great Rock and Blues Festival at Butlins, Skegness (13 January), Rocknytt Cruise in Sweden (21-22 April), H.E.A.T. Festival in Germany (15 April), and in the UK in May a 12-date co-headline tour with FM and Tyketto.

Band members

Current members
Darren Wharton – vocals, keyboards, keytar (1985–1992, 1998–present)
Vinny Burns – guitar (1985–1992, 2008–present)
Nigel Clutterbuck – bass (1989–1992, 2014–present)
Marc Roberts – keyboards (live) (2006–present)
Kevin "Kev" Whitehead – drums (2006–present)

Past members
Brian Cox – keyboards (1986–1992)
Richard "Richie" Dews – guitarist  co-writer/guitar (1991–2014)
Brian Drawbridge – bass (1998–2000)
Julian Gardner – drums (1998–2002)
Simon Gardner – keyboards (1998–2002)
Gavin Mart – drums (2002–2006)
Andrew "Andy" Moore – guitar (1998–2006)
Greg Morgan – drums (1991–1992)
James Ross – drums (1985–1989)
Martin "Shelley" Shelton – bass (1985–1989)
Mark Simpson – keyboards (1986)
Ed Stratton – drums (1985)
Martin Wilding – bass (1998)

Discography

Studio albums

Out of the Silence (1988)
Track listing
 "Abandon" – 4:38
 "Into the Fire" – 4:53 
 "Nothing Is Stronger Than Love" – 4:42
 "Runaway" – 4:27
 "Under the Sun" – 6:13
 "The Raindance" – 5:24
 "King of Spades" – 4:44
 "Heartbreaker" – 3:38
 "Return the Heart" – 5:09
 "Don't Let Go" – 5:57

Blood from Stone (1991)
Track listing
 "Wings of Fire"
 "We Don't Need a Reason"
 "Surrender"
 "Chains"
 "Lies"
 "Live to Fight Another Day"
 "Cry Wolf"
 "Breakout"
 "Wild Heart"
 "Real Love"
 "Walk on the Water" (Japan Bonus Track)

Calm Before the Storm (1998)
Track listing
 "Walk on the Water"
 "Some Day"
 "Calm Before the Storm"
 "Rescue Me"
 "Silence of Your Head"
 "Rising Sun"
 "Ashes"
 "Crown of Thorns"
 "Deliverance"
 "Still in Love with You" (Phil Lynott)
 "Run to Me" (Japan bonus track)

Belief (2001)
Track listing
 "Silent Thunder" – 5:49
 "Dreams on Fire" – 4:29
 "White Horses (Lions Heart)" – 4:06
 "Belief" – 6:07
 "Run Wild Run Free" – 4:32
 "We Were Friends" – 6:42
 "Falling" – 4:29
 "Where Will You Run To" – 3:45
 "Take Me Away" – 5:03
 "Promised Land" – 4:47
 "Phoenix" – 4:14

Beneath the Shining Water (2004)
Track listing
 "Sea of Roses" – 4:37
 "Days Gone By" – 4:13
 "Silent Hills" – 4:03
 "Beneath the Shining Water" – 4:49
 "The Battles That You've Won" – 4:01
 "Allowed to Fall" – 4:12
 "I'll Be the Wind" – 3:59
 "Where Darkness Ends" – 4:36
 "Storm Wind" – 4:24
 "Last Train" – 4:17

Arc of the Dawn (2009)
Track listing
 "Dublin" – 5:15
 "Shelter in the Storm" – 4:34
 "Follow the River" – 3:56
 "King of Spades" (re-recording) – 4:26
 "I Will Return" (re-recording of "Return the Heart") – 4:44
 "Emerald" (Thin Lizzy cover) – 4:38
 "When" – 4:34
 "The Flame" (Cheap Trick cover) – 4:37
 "Still Waiting" – 4:20
 "Kiss the Rain" – 4:14
 "Remember" – 5:04
 "Circles" – 4:11

Calm Before the Storm 2 (2012)
Track listing
 "Walk on the Water" – 6:42
 "Someday" – 4:13
 "Calm Before the Storm" – 6:40
 "Crown of Thorns" – 5:00
 "Precious" – 4:22
 "Silence of Your Head" – 5:21
 "Rescue Me" – 4:40
 "Ashes" – 5:08
 "Rising Sun" – 3:49
 "Cold Wind Will Blow" – 4:31
 "Deliverance" – 3:39

Sacred Ground (2016)
Track listing
 "Home" – 4:44
 "I'll Hear You Pray" – 4:20
 "Strength" – 4:16
 "Every Time We Say Goodbye" – 4:01
 "Days of Summer" – 3:44
 "On My Own" – 3:15
 "Until" – 3:58
 "All Our Brass Was Gold" – 3:48
 "You Carried Me" – 4:11
 "Like the First Time" – 4:18
 "Along the Heather" – 4:01

Out of the Silence II (2018)
Track listing
 "Abandon" – 4:50
 "Into the Fire" – 4:43 
 "Nothing Is Stronger Than Love" – 5:06 
 "Runaway" – 4:38
 "Under the Sun" – 5:55
 "The Raindance" – 5:03
 "King of Spades" (extended edition) – 6:30
 "Heartbreaker" – 3:40
 "Return the Heart" – 4:54
 "Don't Let Go" – 6:23

Road to Eden (2022)
Track listing
 "Born in the Storm" – 4:45
 "Cradle to the Grave" – 4:21
 "Fire Never Fades" – 3:51
 "Road to Eden" – 4:07
 "Lovers and Friends" – 3:43
 "Only the Good Die Young" – 4:37
 "I Always Will" – 4:24
 "Grace" – 3:44
 "The Devil Rides Tonight" – 3:49
 "Thy Kingdom Come" – 4:30
 "Born in a Storm" (Romesh Remix) – 4:21

Live albums

The Power of Nature: Live in Munich (2005)
Track listing (CD + DVD)
 "Sea of Roses"
 "Storm Wind"
 "Where Darkness Ends"
 "Silent Hills"
 "Some Day"
 "Silent Thunder"
 "The Fire"
 "We Will Return"
 "Song for a Friend (The King)"
 "White Horses"

References

External links
 official FaceBook
 Dare's official website
 Born in the Storm - DARE official YouTube
 Born in the Storm
 Prof Brian Cox, Former Rock Star at Love-It-Loud.co.uk
 Abandon 1988 feat. Brian Cox
 We Don't Need A Reason 1991
 Real Love
 Nothing is Stronger than Love

English rock music groups
Musical groups from the Metropolitan Borough of Oldham
Musical groups established in 1985
1985 establishments in England
Musical quintets